Pfitzbach, also called Pfützbach, is a river of Thuringia, Germany. It flows into the Werra in Bad Salzungen.

See also
List of rivers of Thuringia

Rivers of Thuringia
Rivers of Germany